Symphyotrichum shortii (formerly Aster shortii), commonly called Short's aster, is a species of flowering plant in the family Asteraceae. It is native to North America, where it is primarily found in interior areas east of the Mississippi River. Its natural habitat is in thin rocky soils of woodlands and thickets often around limestone bluffs. It is common throughout much of its range, although it is generally restricted to intact natural communities.

Description
It produces flower heads with purple ray florets in late summer and fall. Unlike many related Symphyotrichum species, its stem leaves are essentially entire and do not have a winged petiole. It bears a resemblance to the related Symphyotrichum oolentangiense of farther west, from which S. shortii can be distinguished by its cordate stem leaves and pubescent phyllaries.

Chromosomes
S. shortii has a base number of eight chromosomes (x8). Diploid and tetraploid plants with respective chromosome counts of 16 and 32 have been reported.

Taxonomy
The species was first formally described and named Aster shortii by English botanist John Lindley in 1834. A natural hybrid of S. cordifolium and S. shortii can occur, and this has been named Symphyotrichum × finkii.

Distribution and habitat
Symphyotrichum shortii is native to North America, where it is primarily found in interior areas east of the Mississippi River. Its natural habitat is in thin rocky soils of woodlands and thickets often around limestone bluffs. It is common throughout much of its range, although it is generally restricted to intact natural communities.

Citations

References

shortii
Flora of Ontario
Flora of the United States
Plants used in traditional Native American medicine
Plants described in 1834
Taxa named by John Lindley